The 2nd Jutra Awards were held on March 5, 2000 to honour films made with the participation of the Quebec film industry in 1999. The hosts of the ceremony were Yves Jacques and Élise Guilbault.

Winners and nominees

References

2000 in Quebec
Jutra
02
1999 in Canadian cinema